The 1976–77 Minnesota Fighting Saints season was the last season of WHA hockey in Minnesota. The original Fighting Saints disbanded and the Cleveland Crusaders relocated to become the new Minnesota Fighting Saints. The season came to an early end on January 14, 1977, when the Saints played their last game without finishing the season.

Offseason

Regular season

Final standings

Game log

Playoffs

Player stats

Note: Pos = Position; GP = Games played; G = Goals; A = Assists; Pts = Points; +/- = plus/minus; PIM = Penalty minutes; PPG = Power-play goals; SHG = Short-handed goals; GWG = Game-winning goals
      MIN = Minutes played; W = Wins; L = Losses; T = Ties; GA = Goals-against; GAA = Goals-against average; SO = Shutouts;

Awards and records

Transactions

Draft picks
Minnesota's draft picks (selected while still known as the Cleveland Crusaders) at the 1976 WHA Amateur Draft.

Farm teams

See also
 1976–77 WHA season

References

External links

Minnesota Fighting Saints seasons
Cleveland Crusaders seasons
Minn
Minn